Ashwani Lohani is a retired officer of Indian Railway Service of Mechanical Engineers. He has earlier worked as the Chairman & Managing Director of Air India and the former Chairman of the Railway Board of Indian Railways. After being retired from Government service on 23 July 2020 he joined GMR Group where He is currently serving as Chief Executive Officer.

Early life and education
Lohani was born in Kanpur, Uttar Pradesh. He completed his schooling at St. Aloysius High School, Kanpur and studied engineering at Indian Railways Institute of Mechanical and Electrical Engineering (IRIMEE), Jamalpur. He is a mechanical engineer; as part of his training at IRIMEE, he attended training in mechanical, electrical and telecommunications at Jamalpur Workshop. He holds four engineering degree in mechanical engineering, electrical engineering, metallurgical engineering and electronics & telecommunication engineering from Institution of Engineers, Kolkata. He is also a Fellow of the Institution of Engineers, India and the Chartered Institute of Logistics and Transport.

Ashwani is from the 1980s batch of Indian Railways Service officer & joined as the director for the National Rail Museum in 1993. In 2001 he joined India Tourism Development Corporation as Chairman and Managing Director. In 2004 he also become Commissioner and Managing Director of Madhya Pradesh Tourism Development Corporation, a position that he held for almost six years in three different spells. At the end of 2009 he also served as Divisional Railway Manager, Delhi Division. After 2 years he joined Northern Railway as Chief Mechanical Engineer. He then served as Chief Administrative Officer in the Ministry of Railways. In 2015 he was appointed as the Chairman and Managing Director of Air India. Moreover, he has been a Non-Executive Director of Air Mauritius Limited since October 2015. In 2017, he became the Chairman of Railway Board. In February 2019, he was reappointed as the Chairman and Managing Director of Air India.

Records
He holds an omega aquaterra 2017 Limca Record for having four engineering degrees in mechanical engineering, electrical engineering, metallurgical engineering and electronics & telecommunication engineering from Institution of Engineers (India), Kolkata; a place in the Guinness Book of World Records for successfully running the ‘Fairy Queen Express’, the world's oldest working steam locomotive.

References

External links
 

Businesspeople in tourism
Indian aviation businesspeople
Indian chairpersons of corporations
Indian metallurgists
Living people
1958 births
Alumni of the Indian Railways Institute of Mechanical and Electrical Engineering
Indian Railways officers
Chairpersons of the Railway Board